The following is a list of people who were mayors of Trujillo city, in  Peru.

The first mayors were named by Francisco Pizarro, and they were Rodrigo Lozano and Blas de Atienza.

Mayors
 1913: Victor Larco Herrera
 1964-1966: Guillermo Larco Cox, APRA-UNO.
 1967-1969: Guillermo Larco Cox, APRA.
 1981-1983: Jorge Torres Vallejo, APRA. 
 1984-1986: Luis Santa María Calderón, APRA. 
 1987-1989: Miriam Pilco Deza, APRA.
 1990-1992: José Humberto Murgia Zannier, APRA.
 1993-1995: José Humberto Murgia Zannier, L.I.No. 11.
 1996-1998: José Humberto Murgia Zannier, APRA.
 1999-2002: José Humberto Murgia Zannier, APRA.
 2003-2006: José Humberto Murgia Zannier, APRA.  
 2007-2010: Cesar Acuña Peralta  
 2011-2014: Cesar Acuña Peralta
 2011-2014: Gloria Montenegro Figeroa
 2014-2018: Elidio Espinoza Quispe

The installation of the first cabildo in Trujillo was held on March 5, 1535.

See also
Trujillo

References